Christmas Comes But Once a Year may refer to:

Christmas Comes But Once a Year, a 1936 animated film by Fleischer Studios
"Christmas Comes but Once a Year" (song) by Stan Freberg in 1958 radio play Green Chri$tma$
"Christmas Comes But Once a Year" (Mad Men), 2010 television episode
A precept among the "Five Hundredth Pointes of Good Husbandrie", a 1573 book by Thomas Tusser